Quiet Riot is an American heavy metal band from Los Angeles, California. Formed in May 1975, the group originally included vocalist Kevin DuBrow, guitarist Randy Rhoads, bassist Kelly Garni and drummer Drew Forsyth. The current lineup features bassist Rudy Sarzo (who first joined in 1978), guitarist Alex Grossi (who joined in 2004), vocalist Jizzy Pearl (who joined in 2013) and drummer Johnny Kelly (who joined in 2020).

History

1975–1989
Quiet Riot was formed in 1975 by vocalist Kevin DuBrow, guitarist Randy Rhoads, bassist Kelly Garni and drummer Drew Forsyth. Garni left in late 1978, after an altercation with Rhoads in which he reportedly almost shot the guitarist. He was later replaced by Rudy Sarzo, who was credited on Quiet Riot II despite not performing on the album. Rhoads left in late 1979, after he was hired by Ozzy Osbourne to join his solo band. Rhoads and DuBrow offered the guitarist position to Greg Leon, who joined early the next year alongside bassist Gary Van Dyke, following Sarzo's subsequent departure. The new lineup subsequently dropped the Quiet Riot moniker and briefly worked under DuBrow's name, changing personnel several times, although no new music was released during this period.

The band returned in September 1982 with DuBrow, Sarzo, guitarist Carlos Cavazo and drummer Frankie Banali. Sarzo would later leave in January 1985, with Chuck Wright (who had performed with the group during its tenure as "DuBrow") taking his place. Following several years of "outlandish and bratty behavior", DuBrow was fired from Quiet Riot in February 1987, with the remaining members of the band claiming that the vocalist "had become a very serious detriment to Quiet Riot". He was replaced by Rough Cutt frontman Paul Shortino, while Wright was replaced by Sean McNabb around the same time. Both new members performed on the band's sixth studio QR, released in October 1988. DuBrow sued Quiet Riot over use of the band name in 1989, leading to the group's dissolution.

1991–2007
The vocalist subsequently formed Little Women, later to be renamed ‘Heat’ with English blues guitarist Sean Manning and composed songs together for a new album. They were joined by bassist Kenny Hillery and drummer Pat Ashby… the band was later renamed Quiet Riot once again upon the return of Cavazo in June 1991. Ashby was soon replaced by Bobby Rondinelli, who performed on part of the 1993 release Terrified, before Banali returned to complete the album. Wright subsequently returned to the band in 1994, remaining for three years before Sarzo took his place again after reuniting with his former bandmates at a party hosted by Marilyn Manson. The lineup of Quiet Riot remained stable for six years, during which time it released two studio albums – Alive and Well and Guilty Pleasures – except for three concerts in August 2002, in which former vocalist Shortino filled in for DuBrow for three concerts when DuBrow became ill with the flu. In September 2003, it was announced that the band had broken up following differences between members.

The group's breakup was short-lived, however, as just over a year later Quiet Riot returned with a lineup including DuBrow, Banali, former bassist Wright, and new guitarist Alex Grossi. Grossi was briefly replaced by Tracii Guns in December 2005, although he left after just a month due to musical differences. Neil Citron recorded guitar for the band's eleventh studio album Rehab, while Billy Morris took over as touring guitarist. Wright was also replaced briefly, by Tony Franklin in the studio, before both he and Grossi returned to the band. Quiet Riot remained active for another year, when frontman DuBrow was found dead on November 25, 2007. It was announced later that the singer had died of an "accidental cocaine overdose". Banali later announced that the group would not continue.

2010 onwards
Three years after DuBrow's death, Quiet Riot reformed with new vocalist Mark Huff joining Grossi, Wright and Banali. Huff was fired in January 2012, with former Montrose frontman Keith St. John taking his place for a string of shows in February. Scott Vokoun was later enlisted as Huff's permanent replacement in March. Vokoun remained in the group until the following November, when he was replaced by Love/Hate frontman Jizzy Pearl. Pearl contributed to the band's first studio album in eight years, 2014's Quiet Riot 10, before leaving in December 2016 to focus on his solo career, with Seann Nicols taking his place. Nichols remained for only a few months, however, before he was replaced by James Durbin in March 2017. Durbin later re-recorded Nichols's vocals for the album Road Rage. In 2019, Durbin left to focus on his solo career, with Pearl returning to the band. On August 20, 2020, Banali passed away from pancreatic cancer, at the age of 68. He was eventually replaced by Danzig and former Type O Negative drummer Johnny Kelly. Nearly a year after Banali's death, Quiet Riot announced that bassist Rudy Sarzo was rejoining the band after an eighteen-year hiatus, once again replacing Chuck Wright.

Members

Current

Former

Notes

Timeline

Line-ups

References

External links
Quiet Riot official website

Quiet Riot